Saint John the Baptist Elementary School was a Catholic school located on William Street in Pittston City, Luzerne County, Pennsylvania, United States. It was named after the neighboring church (which was first opened in 1892 by Slovak immigrants). Its pastors were Rev. Andrej Kazincy, Rev. Matthew Jankola, Rev. Andrej Pavco, Rev. John J. Bednarcik (who served from 1929-1961), Rev. Michael J. Krupar (who served until his death on Christmas Day in 1964), Monsignor Joseph Super (who served until 1998), Rev. Andrew Strish (who served until 2005), and finally John Bendick (who led the church until it closed in 2008).

History

Under the leadership of Reverend Andrej Pavco and Reverend Andrew Jurica, ground was purchased for a school next to their church. Construction on the building stated in 1917. By 1924 the newly built Roman Catholic elementary school saw its first graduating class, which only contained nine kids at the time. Over the decades, the school had seen many teachers, graduating classes, administrators, and priests like Reverends Pavco, Bednarcik, Krupar, Super, and Strish.  Charles (Karol) Simalchik (1891-1967) was church and school custodian from the 1930s through the 1960s. He built the flagpole that was next to the rectory.

On March 27, 2004, Bishop Joseph Martino announced that Saint John the Baptist School and Saint Mary's School in Avoca would close for good. After a long fight, which even went legal, the doors closed for good on Friday, June 4, 2004. The last reverend for the elementary school was Andrew Strish. He administered the last school mass for the nearly 200 students and faculty.

"Ninety-five years of Catholic education ends today at Saint John the Baptist," stated the last Principal of the school, Robert Kaluzavich, during the ceremony. He concluded his speech with two words: "SJB Proud."

Four years later, in late June 2008, the diocese closed the doors of the Church too. From December 2009 to March 2010, the Monsignor Joseph A. Super Athletic Center, the Saint John the Baptist Catholic Information Library, the rectory, the flagpole, the church, and a section of the school were demolished.

School colors
Red and White

See also
Seton Catholic High School (Pittston, Pennsylvania)

References

2004 disestablishments in Pennsylvania
1924 establishments in Pennsylvania
Educational institutions established in 1924
Defunct schools in Pennsylvania
Schools in Luzerne County, Pennsylvania
Slovak-American culture in Pennsylvania
Pittston, Pennsylvania